USS Admirable (AM-136) was the lead ship of her class of minesweeper built for the United States Navy during World War II. In commission from 1943 to 1945, she was transferred to the Soviet Navy in 1945 and served as T-331 until stricken in 1958.

Construction and commissioning
Originally classified as a "coastal minesweeper," AMc-113, Admirable was reclassified as a minesweeper, AM-136, on 21 February 1942. She was laid down on 8 April 1942 at Tampa, Florida, by the Tampa Shipbuilding Company. She was launched on 18 October 1942, sponsored by Mrs. Ann Pillsbury Fehr, daughter of Commander Horace W. Pillsbury, and commissioned on 20 April 1943.

Service history

U.S. Navy, World War II, 1943-1945
Admirable departed Tampa on 23 April 1943 and conducted a shakedown cruise in the Gulf of Mexico before heading for Hampton Roads, Virginia, on 23 June 1943. Admirable operated out of Naval Amphibious Base Little Creek, Virginia, for five months of training in antisubmarine warfare, minelaying, and minesweeping techniques. After upkeep and fitting out, she departed Naval Station Norfolk, Virginia, on 28 November 1943 in company with the internal combustion engine repair ship  for duty in the Pacific. Transiting the Panama Canal on 8 December 1943, Admirable continued on to San Diego, California, where she moored on 18 December 1943. In January 1944, following tests at the West Coast Sound School, she received orders to proceed independently to Adak, Territory of Alaska. During the voyage, she encountered heavy seas which damaged her sonar gear. Following her arrival in Kuluk Bay, Adak Island, on 6 February 1944, she was drydocked for repairs.

On 13 February 1944, Admirable was assigned to Task Group 91.2 (TG 91.2). She operated out of Adak, escorting merchant and troopships to such ports in Alaska and the Aleutian Islands as Kodiak, Dutch Harbor, Amchitka, Kiska, Cold Bay, and Attu Island. On four occasions during her 18-month tour in the Aleutians, Admirable went alongside the destroyer tender  at Adak briefly to repair damage caused by the cold weather, heavy seas, and violent, gusting winds known as "williwaws".

In July 1944, Admirable began to clear the minefield in Chiniak Bay off Kodiak Island. The minesweepers then established patrols outside the harbor to await the arrival of President Franklin D. Roosevelt aboard the heavy cruiser . Roosevelt had left San Diego on 14 July, steamed to Pearl Harbor, Territory of Hawaii, to meet with General Douglas MacArthur and Admiral Chester Nimitz to discuss plans for the invasion of the Philippines, and stopped at Kodiak on 7 August 1944. Baltimore pulled out of St. Pauls Harbor the same day, and Roosevelt continued his journey back to the United States aboard the destroyer . Admirable then resumed escort duty and continued that work into March 1945.

On 14 March 1945, Admirables commanding officer was designated officer in tactical command of eight ships and all aircraft participating in a combined air-surface attack on a fictitious submarine in Kuluk Bay. The minesweeper then returned to her escort duties.

Selected for transfer to the Soviet Navy in Project Hula – a secret program for the transfer of U.S. Navy ships to the Soviet Navy at Cold Bay in anticipation of the Soviet Union joining the war against Japan – Admirable proceeded to Dutch Harbor in May 1945 for repairs preparatory to her transfer. Because of the continual beating of the heavy seas,  of the forward end of each of her bilge keels as well as her sonar gear were replaced. With her repairs complete, she then steamed to Cold Bay, where Soviet Navy Rear Admiral Boris Dmitrievich Popov, the Soviet commanding officer at Cold Bay under Project Hula, inspected Admirable on 30 May 1945 and accepted her for transfer to the Soviet Union. On 18 June 1945, a Soviet crew reported on board to train for one month in gunnery, engineering, and minesweeping procedures.

Soviet Navy, 1945-1958
Following the completion of training for her Soviet crew, Admirable was decommissioned on 19 July 1945 at Cold Bay and transferred to the Soviet Union under Lend-Lease immediately. She soon departed Cold Bay bound for Petropavlovsk-Kamchatsky in the Soviet Union, where she served in the Soviet Far East.

In February 1946, the United States began negotiations for the return of ships loaned to the Soviet Union for use during World War II, and on 8 May 1947, United States Secretary of the Navy James V. Forrestal informed the United States Department of State that the United States Department of the Navy wanted 480 of the 585 combatant ships it had transferred to the Soviet Union for World War II use returned. Deteriorating relations between the two countries as the Cold War broke out led to protracted negotiations over the ships, and by the mid-1950s the U.S. Navy found it too expensive to bring home ships that had become worthless to it anyway. Many ex-American ships were merely administratively "returned" to the United States and instead sold for scrap in the Soviet Union, while the U.S. Navy did not seriously pursue the return of others because it viewed them as no longer worth the cost of recovery. The Soviet Union never returned Admirable to the United States, although the U.S. Navy reclassified her as a "fleet minesweeper" (MSF) and redesignated her MSF-136 on 7 February 1955.

Disposal
T-331 was stricken in 1958 and apparently was sold for scrap in the Soviet Union. Unaware of this, the U.S. Navy retained Admirable on its Naval Vessel Register until finally striking her name on 1 January 1983.

References

External links
navsource.org: USS Admirable
hazegray.org: USS Admirable

Admirable-class minesweepers
Ships built in Tampa, Florida
1942 ships
World War II minesweepers of the United States
Admirable-class minesweepers of the Soviet Navy
World War II minesweepers of the Soviet Union
Cold War minesweepers of the Soviet Union
Ships transferred under Project Hula